Crescencio Gutiérrez Aldana (born 26 October 1933) is a Mexican former professional footballer who played as a forward.

Career
Gutiérrez, nicknamed "Mellone", due to his similarity both physically and in his style of play to Paraguayan striker Atilio Mellone, made his professional debut in 1950 at the age of 17 with Guadalajara. During his career at Guadalajara, he was part of the Campeonísimo, winning five Primera División titles (1956–57, 1958–59, 1959–60, 1960–61 and 1961–62).

Gutiérrez later played for Morelia and Atlas.

He played for Mexico at the 1958 FIFA World Cup.

References

External links
FIFA profile

1933 births
Living people
Association football forwards
Mexico international footballers
Liga MX players
C.D. Guadalajara footballers
1958 FIFA World Cup players
Footballers from Guadalajara, Jalisco
Mexican footballers